Major General Prince C. Johnson III is a Liberian military officer. As of 2019, he served as Chief of Staff of the Armed Forces of Liberia.

Biography
Johnson was born on July 12, 1976, in Monrovia. Johnson hails from a Mano family. Johnson's father, Lt. Gen. Prince C. Johnson II had served as Chief of Staff of the EMG Division of the National Patriotic Front of Liberia during the Civil War and as Commanding General of the AFL during the presidency of Charles Taylor.

Johnson obtained a bachelor's degree in Accounting at the United Methodist University in 2004. Johnson completed the Officer Candidate School in 2007, after which he was commissioned as 2nd Lieutenant. In the AFL he subsequently served as a number of positions, including Chief of Operations at the AFL HQ. He served as Military Assistant (MA) to the Minister of National Defense, Brownie J. Samukai Jr.

On February 11, 2014 President Ellen Johnson Sirleaf promoted Johnson as Brigade Commander of the 23rd Infantry Brigade, becoming the first Liberian to hold the post of Brigade Commander in the AFL following the end of the Liberian Civil War. As Brigade Commander, Johnson was third in command of the AFL.

On December 9, 2016 President Ellen Johnson Sirleaf promoted Johnson to Deputy Chief of Staff of the AFL with the rank of Brigadier General, following the death of the incumbent Deputy Chief of Staff Colonel Eric Dennis.

In 2018, President George Weah appointed Johnson as the new Chief of Staff of the AFL, with the promotion to the rank of Major General. The Senate of Liberia confirmed Johnson as new Chief of Staff on February 6, 2018.

References

Living people
1976 births
Liberian military personnel
People from Monrovia
United Methodist University alumni